Eric Gagnon, who also goes by the name Easy E (born on 1 August 1971 in Houston, TX) is an American bass player, guitarist, and music producer. He has produced for the Black Lips, among others.

References

1971 births
Living people
Record producers from Texas
Musicians from Houston
Guitarists from Texas
American male bass guitarists
21st-century American bass guitarists
21st-century American male musicians